Fernando Alvarez (August 30, 1937 – June 27, 1999) was an American Thoroughbred horse racing jockey and trainer who rode winners from coast to coast including in the two most important races in California.

A native of Santiago Chile, Alvarez began riding there at age sixteen, winning with his very first mount. The following year he went to Panama where he rode for seven years before emigrating to the United States.

In 1964 Fernando Alvarez rode Roman Brother to a second-place finish in the third leg of the U.S. Triple Crown series, the Belmont Stakes. He then won with the colt in the American Derby and Discovery Handicap. Alvarez's most significant wins came at Santa Anita Park for Louis R. Rowan, co-founder of the Oak Tree Racing Association. Aboard Ruken, he won the 1967 Santa Anita Derby and on Quicken Tree, the 1970 Santa Anita Handicap. Alvarez followed up on his victories in the Santa Anita Derby and the Stepping Stone Purse at Churchill Downs that gave him his first ever mount in the Kentucky Derby in which he finished eighth.

After retiring from riding at the end of 1976, Fernando Alvarez turned to training for a time and on March 27, 1977 earned his first win at Santa Anita Park.

Fernando Alvarez died on June 27, 1999 at age sixty-one. He was living in Azusa, California at the time of his death. His son, Fernando Alvarez Jr., also became a trainer.

References

1937 births
1999 deaths
Chilean jockeys
American jockeys
American horse trainers
Chilean emigrants to the United States
Sportspeople from Santiago
People from Azusa, California